Gephyrea  is a now-dismantled class of marine worms, containing the three modern taxa Echiura, Sipuncula, and Priapulida. This class was not monophyletic. Priapulida are now considered a distinct phylum among Ecdysozoa, while the other two taxa are classified as Annelids. The word was created by Quatrefages from the Greek γέφυρα (géphura) 'bridge', because these animals seemed intermediate between Annelids and Holothurians.

References 

Obsolete animal taxa
Protostome classes